was a railway station in Oshamambe, Yamakoshi District, Hokkaidō Prefecture, Japan.

Lines
Hokkaido Railway Company
Hakodate Main Line Station H50

Surrounding area
  National Route 5
 Hakodate Bus "Kita-Toyotsu Shingo-sho Mae" Bus Stop

Railway stations in Japan opened in 1944
Railway stations in Hokkaido Prefecture